Pieter Jelles Troelstra (20 April 186012 May 1930) was a Dutch lawyer, journalist and politician active in the socialist workers' movement. He is most remembered for his fight for universal suffrage and his failed call for revolution at the end of World War I. From 1888 to 1904, Troelstra was married to Sjoukje Bokma de Boer, a well-known children's book writer, under the pen name of Nienke van Hichtum.

Early life
Troelstra was born 20 April 1860 in Leeuwarden and grew up in the village of Stiens, where his father was a liberal tax inspector. He was an ethnic Frisian, and his name is styled in the traditional Frisian way: first name ("Pieter", because of his Frisian writings, is often written as "Piter", as it is spelled in Frisian), patronymic ("Jelles", meaning "son of Jelle"), family name (Troelstra).

He went on to study law at the University of Groningen. After graduation, he settled in Leeuwarden as a lawyer. He had originally joined this movement because of his poetry and interest in the West Frisian language. Through the movement and his work as a lawyer, he got into the social democratic part of this wide movement.

Involvement with SDB
In 1890, Troelstra joined the Social Democratic League (SDB), an early Dutch socialist movement under the leadership of Ferdinand Domela Nieuwenhuis. In time, he got into conflict with the anarchist tendencies of the movement. In 1893, the SDB took a decisive anti-parliamentary stance, and Troelstra no longer believed it could do any useful socialist work.

Founding of SDAP

After trying to get some members of the SDB to join him, he was one of the twelve men who started the Social Democratic Workers' Party (SDAP) in 1894. Unlike the old SDB, the SDAP was more like its German counterpart, then still also named the SDAP, which was taking a more reformist course, trying to get social law implemented, while still keeping the ideal of revolution up.

Hogerhuis Case
In 1897, Troelstra, who now earned a living as a lawyer, got involved in the infamous Hogerhuis Case concerning three brothers (Keimpe, Wybren and Marten Hogerhuis) who were being prosecuted for the burglary of a rich farmer.

Troelstra was the member of parliament for the district of Leeuwarden, close to the men's village of Beetgum, and was drawn into the case after the brothers' conviction. He collected additional evidence, which he published in socialist newspapers. One of his revelations was that soon after the burglary, three men had quickly emigrated to America and Germany. However, Troelstra did not manage to get the case retried. The affair gained fame, particularly in socialist circles, as the Dutch pendant of the French Dreyfus Affair, and Troelstra's role was, perhaps not coincidentally, not unlike that played by Émile Zola. Despite the failure of his efforts (the brothers served most of their sentence), they contributed to Troelstra's reputation and goodwill in the Frisian countryside.

SDAP leader
Troelstra was inclusive in his outlook. As leader of the parliamentary faction of the SDAP, he did not insist upon a tight party line. That permitted a period of harmony within the SDAP between 1894 and 1900.

Both within and outside parliament, the SDAP proved to be a powerful force, despite its relatively small representation in the House of Representatives. However, the socialists felt a moral advantage because parliament was hardly an accurate representation of the people, and they used their possibilities to the full, among other things by filibustering (each representative had unlimited speaking time). When, in 1911 a majority of parliament refused to vote on an SDAP motion, the anger of the party was expressed by one of its most fiery speakers, :
In that case, the inkwells will fly through the room.... I cannot be held accountable for anything. I assure you, we will start throwing chairs.The antagonism between the SDAP and more conservative forces would cause bitterness for a long time afterwards and also explains many of Troelstra's actions.

1913 elections and universal suffrage
Troelstra's biggest political issue was universal suffrage in the Netherlands. This struggle reached its climax in 1910 to 1913. After electoral success in the 1913 general election, the SDAP was offered a place in a coalition government. The proposed coalition had plans for universal suffrage, but a party congress renounced such a close co-operation with its traditional enemy. Some MPs, such as the SDAP's co-founders  and Schaper, were very distraught over what they saw as a tactical disaster. Vliegen wrote in 1934:
I have never been able to prefer a government without social democrats over one with them, as evident as it may be that one cannot entertain all company. I still think that the refusal to accept government responsibility in 1913 is one of the most significant errors the SDAP ever made.

There is evidence to suggest that Troelstra himself was rather relieved; he had only reluctantly supported the request for government participation. Universal suffrage was eventually steered through parliament in 1917, by the liberal minority cabinet of Pieter Cort van der Linden.

Red Week (November 1918)

Inspired by the Russian Revolution of 1917 and the German Revolution of 1918–1919, Troelstra made a historic if ill-advised move. In November 1918, he used a speech in the traditional worker stronghold of Rotterdam to call for a socialist revolution in the Netherlands. However, it was not followed up by any revolutionary activity on the side of other SDAP activists, who were as surprised by Troelstra's declaration as most other people. The government, on the other hand, reacted quickly and sent troops to the major cities. In addition, a counter-campaign was set up to emphasise loyalty to the House of Orange.

By that time, it had become clear that the attempted revolution, for which Troelstra had gathered very little support even among his own party, had failed. The events are known as the Red Week (Dutch: Roode Week) or, more commonly, "Troelstra's mistake" (Dutch: Vergissing van Troelstra).

Later life
After all this Troelstra was broken and stayed at home, but a party conference two weeks later received him with a standing ovation. Although he could defend the position that the party had never had actual plans for a coup, his reputation had taken irreparable damage, both inside and outside the party.

The SDAP would not be invited to form any other government until the national cabinet of 1939. However, the establishment and the right wing had been frightened. In the next cabinet, under Hendrikus Colijn, social reforms were started to reduce discontent and to deny the socialists further support.

Troelstra is still an inspirational figure for many in the Dutch workers' movement.

He withdrew from politics in 1925 and devoted much time, despite ever declining health, to dictating his memoirs to his secretary, the later Amsterdam alderman . These memoirs (Gedenkschriften), which appeared in four volumes (Genesis, Growth, Surf and Storm) after 1925, almost became part of the furniture in the houses of many Dutch workers, further testimony to Troelstra's reputation among his followers.

Troelstra died 12 May 1930 in The Hague. The section in The Hague of the Labour Party, the successor of the SDAP, celebrates at a monument to Troelstra.

References

 Pieter Jelles Troelstra in Biografisch Woordenboek van het Socialisme en de Arbeidersbeweging in Nederland (BWSA)
  Troelstra in 'The Memory of the Netherlands'

External links
 
 Archief Pieter Jelles Troelstra at the International Institute of Social History
 

1860 births
1930 deaths
19th-century Dutch lawyers
Dutch republicans
Social Democratic Workers' Party (Netherlands) politicians
Members of the Executive of the Labour and Socialist International
Members of the House of Representatives (Netherlands)
People from Leeuwarden
People from Leeuwarderadeel
University of Groningen alumni